The Rote Säule (also Rote Saile) is a mountain,  on the main chain of the Alps in the Venediger Group. It lies on the border between the Austrian states of Salzburg and  East Tyrol.

Location and ascent 
The Rote Säule is a peak in the extreme north of the district of Lienz. It is located on the main chain of the Tauern between the Roter Kogel to the southeast and the Abretter to the northwest, the Rote Säule being separated from the Abretter by the col of Abretterscharte. The Rote Säule has a wide north and east face. To the south are the remains of a glacier, the Gschlößkees. The Rote Säule may be climbed from the Venedigerhaus, the route branching off from the Sandebentörl path towards the northwest.

References

Literature 
 Willi End, Hubert Peterka: Alpine Club guide Venedigergruppe. Bergverlag Rother, 5th edition, Munich, 2006, .
 Alpine Club map 1:25,000, Sheet 36, Venedigergruppe, .

External links 

Two-thousanders of Austria
Venediger Group
Geography of East Tyrol